Ceratogyrus is a genus of tarantulas found in southern Africa. They are commonly called horned baboons for the foveal horn found on the peltidium in some species.

Diagnosis 
They are readily distinguished from other African theraphosid genera by the combined presence of a retrolateral cheliceral scopula, composed of plumose, stridulatory setae, and the strongly procurved fovea. The fovea is typically strongly procurved and in some species surrounds a distinct protuberance. This protuberance may take the form of a simple posterior extension of the caput, a low-set plug or a prominent, discrete conical projection. All Ceratogyrus species possess a pale yellow anteriorly placed, transverse, sub-abdominal band. This feature is not distinct in other Harpatirinae except Augacephalus junodi. The absence of dense, ventral femoral fringes on the palpi and legs I and II distinguish Ceratogyrus spp. from female A. junodi.

Horn function 
C. marshalli features the biggest horn, where it stands straight up about 1 cm. There are several probable functions for this horn: according to a study by Rick C. West in 1986, it provides an increased surface for the attachment of the dorsal dilator muscle, which aids in drawing in liquefied food into the sucking stomach at a faster rate; this way, the spider can retreat to a safe place faster. It also increases the area for the midgut diverticula to expand during times of nutrient and water availability, analogous to a camel's hump, helping it to survive in its arid habitat during droughts.

Species
, the World Spider Catalog accepted the following species:
Ceratogyrus attonitifer Engelbrecht, 2019 – Angola
Ceratogyrus brachycephalus Hewitt, 1919 – Botswana, Zimbabwe, South Africa
Ceratogyrus darlingi Pocock, 1897 (type species) – Southern Africa
Ceratogyrus dolichocephalus Hewitt, 1919 – Zimbabwe
Ceratogyrus hillyardi (Smith, 1990) – Malawi
Ceratogyrus marshalli Pocock, 1897 – Zimbabwe, Mozambique
Ceratogyrus meridionalis (Hirst, 1907) – Malawi, Mozambique
Ceratogyrus paulseni Gallon, 2005 – South Africa
Ceratogyrus pillansi (Purcell, 1902) – Zimbabwe, Mozambique
Ceratogyrus sanderi Strand, 1906 – Namibia, Zimbabwe

In synonymy
Ceratogyrus bechuanicus (Purcell, 1902) = Ceratogyrus darlingi
Ceratogyrus cornuatus (De Wet & Dippenaar-Schoeman, 1991) = Ceratogyrus marshalli
Ceratogyrus schultzei Purcell, 1908 = Ceratogyrus darlingi

Transferred to other genera
Ceratogyrus ezendami  Gallon, 2001 → Augacephalus ezendami
Ceratogyrus nigrifemur (Schmidt, 1995) → Augacephalus junodi 
Ceratogyrus raveni (Smith, 1990) → Pterinochilus chordatus

References

 Pocock, R.I. (1897). On the spiders of the suborder Mygalomorphae from the Ethiopian Region, contained in the collection of the British Museum. Proceedings of the Zoological Society of London 1897:724-774.
 West, R.C. (1986). Ceratogyrus. Journal of the British Tarantula Society 1(4):79-80.
 Gallon, R.C. (2001). Revision of the Ceratogyrus spp. formerly included in Coelogenium (Araneae: Theraphosidae, Harpactirinae). Mygalomorph 2:1-20. PDF
 Messenger, P. (2004). Captive Breeding Ceratogyrus meridionalis. J. Brit. Tarantula Soc. 19(4):113-117. PDF
 Gallon, R.C. (2005c). A new species of theraphosid spider from Southern Africa (Araneae, Theraphosidae, Harpactirinae) with distributional notes on other harpactirines. Bull. Br. arachnol. Soc. 13(5):179-184. PDF (C. paulseni)

External links
 Reference list
 Photos of three Ceratogyrus species in gallery of tarantulas.

Theraphosidae
Spiders of Africa
Theraphosidae genera